Christoph Schwab (born 14 October 1962 in Flörsheim am Main, Germany) is a German applied mathematician, specializing in numerical analysis of partial differential equations and boundary integral equations.

Education and career
He studied mathematics from 1982 to 1985 at the Technische Universität Darmstadt. By means of a Fulbright Scholarship, from 1985 he studied at the University of Maryland, College Park, where he received his PhD in 1989. His thesis Dimensional Reduction for Elliptic Boundary Value Problems was written under the supervision of Ivo Babuška. Schwab was a postdoc for the academic year 1989–1990 at London's University of Westminster. At the University of Maryland, Baltimore County he was an assistant professor from 1990 to 1995 and was appointed in 1995 an associate professor. At ETH Zurich, Schwab was from 1995 to 1998 an associate professor and is since 1998 a full professor. For the academic year 1993–1994 he was a visiting scientist at the IBM Deutschland Wissenschaftliches Zentrum (IBM German Scientific Center) in Heidelberg.

In 2002 Schwab was an invited speaker at the International Congress of Mathematicians in Beijing.

Selected publications

Articles

Books

References

1962 births
Living people
20th-century German mathematicians
21st-century German mathematicians
Numerical analysts
Technische Universität Darmstadt alumni
University of Maryland, College Park alumni
University of Maryland, Baltimore County faculty
Academic staff of ETH Zurich